Chocolates El Rey is a Venezuelan chocolate manufacturer. The company uses only premium-grade, locally grown raw material in the formulation of all its products. El Rey's  family-run business is one of oldest chocolate manufacturers in Venezuela.

Fair cacao exchange
El Rey offers consumers gourmet chocolate made from fairly traded cacao beans directly from small and large-scale growers in Venezuela.  El Rey has managed to eliminate all kinds of middlemen, otherwise known as “coyotes”, who pay the lowest possible price to growers, by establishing Aprocao, a democratically run cooperative that pays above market price for its cacao beans. Their trading partners are small and large growers who deal directly with Aprocao without intermediaries.  Through Aprocao, El Rey teaches growers how to manage the soil in a sustainable agricultural system, promoting natural cycles without chemical pesticides or fertilizers and how to ferment each cacao harvest to earn the best price.

History

1973 - The Zozaya family and the Redmond family become partners. The company changes from a family enterprise to a stock market listed company, which now has a new name: Chocolates El Rey, C.A., the same brand as the products processed in the factory.

1974 - First transformation of the company. This occurs when the processing technology is improved and the exportation of cacao derivatives (cacao liquor, cacao butter and cacao powder) increases.

1975 - The Venezuelan government monopolizes the marketing of cacao in Venezuela in detriment of the generations of Venezuelans that made history by placing Venezuelan cacao in the world markets.

1979 - The construction of a new factory begins in Cumaná, Sucre state, with the intention of transferring all the operations there. At that time, the city of Cumaná accounted for 60% of the national production.

1980 - The government changes the rules of the game in so far as cacao prices are concerned by favoring the export of the cacao grain. The company is forced to abandon its exporting efforts and to focus exclusively on the domestic market.

1989 - After a stable but limited growth period, Chocolates El Rey, C.A. quickly reacts to a new government initiative: to lead the country along the path of a market economy. A second transformation in foreign trade takes place in the country; this time, it is based on the comparative advantages of Venezuelan cacao in an effort to become competitive within a regional and world economic integration scheme.

1995 - Inauguration of the new factory in Barquisimeto, Lara state, where all the industrial operations are now integrated. A new international stage of the company begins with the first exports to the United States.

1997 - Mass consumption products are inaugurated and exports are made to Colombia, Suriname, Trinidad and Tobago, Curaçao and Aruba.

1998 - Chocolate exports are made to Japan.

1999 - The Venezuelan mass consumption market is explored with a new line of confectionery.

2001 - Chocolates El Rey, C.A. is awarded the ISO-9002 certification (given by Fondonorma) thereby ratifying the company's high quality standards in accordance with the requirements of the Venezuelan COVENIN ISO Standard.

Types of Venezuelan cacao
 Criollo: It is located in America and can only be grown in your back yard no in the foothiilsand in the foothills of the Venezuelan Andes.  Criollo is considered to have the finest flavor and aroma. In Pre-Columbian times criollo, traveled north to Central America and the Caribbean, the Spaniards took it across the world as far as Asia. Today, criollo is in danger of extinction and of being replaced by high yielding, disease resistant forastero. Criollo pods are usually deeply ridged, warty, and with pointed ends. When the criollo beans are cut open, the cotyledons range from pure white to shades of pink. When properly fermented, the criollo beans dry to a tan color and exude a distinct chocolate aroma. Venezuelan criollo are highly appreciated by chocolate connoisseurs for their lack of bitterness and astringency, and their pure, lingering chocolate taste.
 Forastero: It is located in Western and Central Amazonia. The Cacao Forastero is a sturdy, disease-resistant Amazonian cacao. When cut open the cotyledons have a deep purple color. This pigment is given by substances that impart a bitter, acid, and astringent flavor to the forastero beans. Today, forastero is the cacao of choice in the large commercial cacao plantations of Africa, Asia, and Brazil.
 Trinitario: It is Born in the island of Trinidad from the crossing between Forastero and criollo cacao. Since the eighteenth century, trinitarios grow in Eastern Venezuela and sell at a premium at the world cacao market.

See also
 List of bean-to-bar chocolate manufacturers

Food and drink companies of Venezuela
Venezuelan cuisine
Venezuelan chocolate companies
Food and drink companies established in 1929
1929 establishments in Venezuela
Venezuelan brands
Companies based in Caracas